Kocha, lubi, szanuje (English translation,  Love, Cherish, Respect  ) is a 1934 Polish language romantic comedy film, produced in Poland by the European subsidiary of  Universal Pictures and directed by Michał Waszyński.

Cast
Eugeniusz Bodo ...  Władysław, drugstore clerk
Loda Halama ...  Loda, Władysław's girl
Zula Pogorzelska ...  Kunegunda
Władysław Walter ...  Franciszek, stangret
Michał Znicz...  Aptekarz
Helena Zarembina ...  Żona aptekarza
Wojciech Ruszkowski ...  Hrabia
Konrad Tom...  Reżyser
Stanisław Sielański ...  Inspicjent
Ludwik Lawiński ...  Właściciel sklepu
Wanda Jarszewska ...  Dama do towarzystwa
Paweł Owerłło ...  Dyrektor
Elżbieta Kryńska ...  Sekretarka
Maria Chmurkowska ...  Diwa rewiowa

External links 
 
 Kocha, lubi, szanuje at the Internet Polish Movie Database 

1934 films
1930s Polish-language films
Polish black-and-white films
Films directed by Michał Waszyński
1934 romantic comedy films
Polish romantic comedy films